12th Army Corps may refer to:

12th Army Corps (France)
12th Army Corps (Russian Empire)
12th Army Corps (Soviet Union)